Lipotriches krombeini is a species of bee in the genus Lipotriches, of the family Halictidae.

References

External links 
 https://web.archive.org/web/20150210070256/http://www.sljol.info/index.php/JNSFSL/article/view/134
 http://slendemics.net/easl/invertibrates/bees/bees.html
 http://apoidea.lifedesks.org/pages/8239
 https://www.gbif.org/species/1352227

Halictidae
Insects described in 1978